MZB may refer to:

 Marion Zimmer Bradley (1930–1999), an American author of fantasy novels
 Mocímboa da Praia Airport, Mozambique airport IATA code
 Mozabite language ISO 639-3 code